An Ideal Husband is a 1935 German comedy film directed by Herbert Selpin and starring Brigitte Helm, Sybille Schmitz and Karl Ludwig Diehl. It is based on the 1895 play An Ideal Husband by Oscar Wilde, a sensitive and romantic comedy representing the 19th century. The adaptation by Thea von Harbou is very faithful to the original work.

The film's sets were designed by the art directors Artur Günther and Benno von Arent. Interiors were shot at Terra Film's Marienfelde Studios, while extensive location shooting took place in London.

Main cast
 Brigitte Helm as Lady Gertrud Chiltern
 Sybille Schmitz as Gloria Cheveley
 Karl Ludwig Diehl as Lord Robert Chiltern
 Georg Alexander as Lord Arthur Goring
 Anni Markart as Mabel Chiltern
 Paul Henckels as Lord Caversham
 Werner Scharf as Vicomte de Nanjac
 Karl Dannemann as Parker, Oberingenieur
 Heinz Förster-Ludwig as Mason, Diener bei Chiltern
 Karl Platen as Phips, Diener bei Goring
 Erich Walter as Montfort, Sekretär bei Chiltern
 Hermann Frick as Vickers, Buchhalter
 Toni Tetzlaff as Lady Markby 
 Valy Arnheim as Angestellter im Palladium 
 Hilde Maroff as Telefonistin 
 Charles Willy Kayser as Chilterns Gast 
 Ludwig Trautmann as Chilterns Gast

References

Bibliography

External links
 

1935 films
German comedy films
1930s German-language films
Films directed by Herbert Selpin
Films set in England
Films set in London
Films shot in London
German films based on plays
Films based on works by Oscar Wilde
Films of Nazi Germany
Films with screenplays by Thea von Harbou
German black-and-white films
Terra Film films
1935 comedy films
1930s German films
Films shot at Terra Studios